The following highways are numbered 447:

Japan
 Japan National Route 447

United States
  Kentucky Route 447
  Louisiana Highway 447
  Maryland Route 447 (former)
  Montana Secondary Highway 447
  Nevada State Route 447
  Pennsylvania Route 447
  Puerto Rico Highway 447
  Texas State Highway Spur 447